Martha Elizabeth Duncan Walker Cook ( – ) was an American author, translator, and editor.  

Her siblings included Senator Robert J. Walker. In 1824, she married General William Cook. They were the parents of Eugene Beauharnais Cook, a writer of books on chess.

In 1863, she became editor of the Continental Review after her brother Robert purchased a half-interest in the journal.  She toned down the strident political content and published her own poetry in the journal.  The most notable work she published was "A Tragedy of Error" in February 1864, the first published story by Henry James.  The journal folded later that year.

Cook had a particular affinity for Poland and Polish culture.  She translated two works related to Poland from French and German: The Life of Chopin (1863) by Franz Liszt and The Undivine Comedy and Other Poems (1875) by Zygmunt Krasiński.  She also published translations of Polish drama in the Continental Review.

Her other works include a translation of a biography of Joan of Arc by Guido Görres, serialized in Freeman's Journal.  She also wrote a number of hymns, including the popular "In some way or other the Lord will provide".

Martha Elizabeth Duncan Walker Cook died on 15 September 1874 in Hoboken, New Jersey.

References 

Created via preloaddraft
1806 births
1874 deaths
American women writers
American women editors
American hymnwriters
American translators